The Adirondack Mountain Club (ADK) is a nonprofit organization founded in 1922. It has approximately 30,000 members.  The ADK is dedicated to the protection and responsible recreational use of the New York State Forest Preserve, parks, wild lands, and waters; it conducts conservation, and natural history programs. There are 27 local chapters in New York and New Jersey. The club has worked to increase state holdings in the Adirondack Park and to protect the area from commercial development.

History
The idea of forming the ADK was conceived by Meade C. Dobson, an official of the New York State Association of Real Estate Boards and the Palisades Interstate Park Trail Conference, who felt there was need for a private organization that could help the State develop trails and shelters to make remote areas of the Adirondacks more accessible to hikers and backpackers. Encouraged by support from George D. Pratt, Conservation Commissioner of New York State, and William G. Howard, Superintendent of Forests, Dobson invited other like-minded individuals to an organizational meeting. 

The initial meeting, attended by 40 people, took place on December 5, 1921, in the log cabin atop the Abercrombie & Fitch sporting goods store in New York City.  An organization committee was formed, including representatives of outing, recreational, educational, government, and business interests. The club's objectives were to develop and maintain hiking trails, to construct and maintain campsites and permanent camps, to publish trail maps and guidebooks, and to educate the public regarding the conservation of natural resources and prevention of forest fires.  

In its early years when there were few trails, ADK supplemented the work of the New York State Conservation Department by clearing and marking 140 miles of trails. One of the first trails constructed by club members was the 133-mile Northville-Placid Trail which traverses the Adirondacks in a north-south orientation.

Gifford Pinchot, first chief of the U.S. Forest Service, was an early member, and Franklin and Eleanor Roosevelt were life members of the ADK.

In an introduction to the club's 20th anniversary Annual Report in 1942, then president Roosevelt wrote "[This is] an appropriate time to emphasize the Club's initial statement of policy, adhered to and acted upon vigorously throughout the years, that 'the Adirondack Forest preserve belongs to the people of the State of New York' and that 'we believe in a continuing policy that shall give the widest and wisest use of the Forest to all.' "

Activities
The club maintains two lodges, the Adirondak Loj in North Elba and the Johns Brook Lodge in Keene Valley, which provide bunkrooms and private rooms, and communal meals as well as campsites.  Johns Brook, at the foot of the Great Range, is accessible only by hiking, with the easiest route being a  hike from Keene Valley.  ADK offers extensive programming all across New York State all year around. Activities include hiking, biking, paddling, snowshoeing, skiing and much more. Visit adk.org to learn more about the educational and recreational programs that are offered.

Chapters
 Adirondack Loj Chapter - https://www.adk.org/adk-chapter/adirondak-loj/
 Albany Chapter - http://www.adk-albany.org/
 Algonquin Chapter - https://www.adk.org/adk-chapter/algonquin/
 Binghamton Chapter - http://www.binghamtonadk.org/
 Black River Chapter - http://www.prnewell.com/adk/
 Cold River Chapter - https://www.adk.org/adk-chapter/cold-river/
 Finger Lakes Chapter - http://adkfingerlakes.org/
 Foothills Chapter - http://www.adk.org/page.php?pname=foothills-chapter
 Genesee Valley Chapter - http://www.gvc-adk.org
 Glens Falls-Saratoga Chapter - http://www.adk-gfs.org/
 Hurricane Mountain Chapter - http://www.adk.org/page.php?pname=hurricane-mountain-chapter
 Iroquois Chapter - http://www.adk.org/page.php?pname=iroquois-chapter
 Keene Valley Chapter - http://www.adk.org/page.php?pname=keene-valley-chapter
 Lake Placid Chapter - https://www.facebook.com/ADKLakePlacid/
 Laurentian Chapter - http://adklaurentian.org/
 Long Island Chapter - http://www.adkli.org/
 Mid-Hudson Chapter - https://midhudsonadk.org/
 Mohican Chapter - http://www.adkmohican.org/
 New York Chapter - http://www.adkny.org/ 
 Niagara Frontier Chapter - http://adk-nfc.org/
 North Jersey Ramapo Chapter - http://www.hudsonhikers.org/
 Northville-Placid Trail Chapter - http://www.nptrail.org/
 North Woods Chapter - http://www.adk.org/page.php?pname=north-woods-chapter 
 Onondaga Chapter - http://www.adk-on.org/
 Schenectady Chapter - http://www.adk-schenectady.org/
 Shatagee Woods Chapter - http://www.shatageeadk.org/
 Susquehanna Chapter - https://web.archive.org/web/20160826170541/http://www.susqadk.org/

References

External links

www.adk.org Official Adirondack Mountain Club website
Adirondack Mountain Club Records: 1922 — present
Why F.D.R. joined the ADK — (at the Wayback Machine)

Adirondacks
Environmental organizations based in the United States
Hiking organizations in the United States
History of New York (state)
Rustic architecture in New York (state)
1922 establishments in New York City
Nature conservation organizations based in the United States
Adirondack Park